(formerly Nihon Kaiheiki Kogyo Co., Ltd.) is a designer and manufacturer of diversified industrial operational switches. The company offers illuminated, process sealed, miniature, specialty, surface mount and LCD programmable switches. The company also manufactures toggle, rocker, pushbutton, slide, DIP, rotary, keypad and keylock switches.

Affiliates
 NKK Switches of America, Inc. (Scottsdale, AZ)
 NKK Switches Hong Kong Co., Ltd. (Hong Kong)
 NKK Switches Mactan, Inc. (Philippines)

References

External links

NKK group portal site 
NKK switches of America 
NKK switches Co., Ltd. 

Electronics companies of Japan
Electrical equipment manufacturers
Electrical engineering companies of Japan
Companies based in Kanagawa Prefecture
Companies listed on the Tokyo Stock Exchange
Electronics companies established in 1953
1953 establishments in Japan
Japanese brands